Eventbrite is an American event management and ticketing website. The service allows users to browse, create, and promote local events. The service charges a fee to event organizers in exchange for online ticketing services, unless the event is free.

Launched in 2006 and headquartered in San Francisco, Eventbrite opened their first international office in the United Kingdom in 2012. The company has local offices in Nashville, London, Cork, Amsterdam, Dublin, Berlin, Melbourne, Mendoza, Madrid, and São Paulo.

The company went public on the New York Stock Exchange on September 20, 2018 under the ticker symbol EB.

History 
Eventbrite was founded in 2006 by Kevin Hartz (Co-Founder and Executive Chairman) and Julia Hartz (Co-Founder and CEO) and Renaud Visage (Co-Founder and CTO). The company was the first major player in this market in the US.

Prior to his position at the company, Kevin Hartz was involved with PayPal and was the Co-Founder and CEO of Xoom Corporation, an international money transfer company. Julia Hartz, wife of Kevin, was raised in Santa Cruz, CA. After studying broadcasting at Pepperdine University, she became a creative executive at FX Network in Los Angeles. Soon after the two became engaged, she moved to the Bay Area and helped co-found Eventbrite.

On March 18, 2011 Eventbrite raised $50 million in Series E Financing led by Tiger Global. On April 22, 2013, Eventbrite raised another $60 million in growth capital financing led by Tiger Global, and including T. Rowe Price. On March 13, 2014, Eventbrite raised a private equity round of $60 million, and on September 1, 2017, the company raised $134 million in a Series G funding round. This brought their total funding to $334 million. Previous funding involved firms including Sequoia Capital, DAG Ventures and Tenaya Capital.

In 2016, Julia became the CEO of Eventbrite, while Kevin took the role of executive chairman.

In March 2017, Eventbrite purchased D.C.-based event tech startup Nvite for an undisclosed sum. On June 9, 2017 Eventbrite purchased Ticketfly from Pandora for $200 million. The acquisition was meant to strengthen Eventbrite's position in the live music market, but according to observers, executives were still struggling to integrate Ticketfly as of 2019.

In April 2018, Eventbrite acquired the Spanish ticketing service Ticketea, citing its events discovery platform and "robust ecosystem of third-party integrations" as being advantageous. Later that month, Eventbrite was subjected to criticism over an update to its merchants' agreement, which specified that the service had the right to attend and record footage of any aspect of an event for any purpose, and that event organizers were "responsible for obtaining, at your own cost, all third party permissions, clearances, and licenses necessary to secure Eventbrite the permissions and rights [to do so]." Following public backlash, Eventbrite chose to remove the passage entirely. The company stated that it wanted the option to "work with individual organizers to secure video and photos at their events for marketing and promotional purposes", but admitted that the clauses were too broadly-worded.

In August 2018, Picatic, a Vancouver-based ticketing and event registration platform, was acquired by Eventbrite.

In April 2020, during the coronavirus pandemic which was causing a drastic drop in in-person events, Eventbrite laid off around 45% of its employees, which at that point numbered between 1,000 and 1,100. Reportedly, online events had amounted to less than 10% of the company's revenue in 2019.

In November 2020, the company acquired ToneDen, a social media marketing service based in Los Angeles.

Funding 
On March 18, 2011, Eventbrite raised $50 million in Series E Financing led by Tiger Global. On April 22, 2013, Eventbrite raised another $60 million in growth capital financing led by Tiger Global, and including T. Rowe Price.

On August 23, 2018, the company filed for a $200 million IPO. The company's biggest shareholder is Tiger Global Management with Sequoia Capital and the Hartzs also owning significant shares.

Customer satisfaction 
The Trustpilot rating for the UK is just 1.3, revealing a high level of customer dissatisfaction, and there are multiple allegations of poor business practice.

References

External links
 

Ticket sales companies
Event management companies of the United States
Social planning websites
Internet properties established in 2006
2006 establishments in California
Entertainment companies established in 2006
Companies listed on the New York Stock Exchange
2018 initial public offerings
Companies based in San Francisco